The Blackiston Formation is a geologic formation in Indiana. It preserves fossils dating back to the Devonian period.

See also

 List of fossiliferous stratigraphic units in Indiana

References
 

Devonian Indiana
Devonian southern paleotemperate deposits